Nipponoolithus is an oogenus of fossil egg native to Japan. It is one of the smallest known dinosaur eggs, and was probably laid by some kind of non-avian maniraptor.

Distribution
Nipponoolithus remains are known from the Sasayama Group in Kamitaki, southeastern Tamba, Hyogo, Japan. The site is dated to the lower Albian.

History
Though fossil dinosaur skeletons are rare in Japan, they have been well-documented since 1978. The first Japanese fossil eggs were discovered in 2003: Yoichi Azuma documented numerous eggs of the Ratite morphotype in the Kitadani Formation, and Ren Hirayama et al. documented dinosaur and turtle eggshells in the Kuwijima Formation. However, these eggs were never described in detail. In 2006, the dinosaur-rich Kamitaki locality in the Sasayam Group was discovered. In 2016,  a team of paleontologists from Japan and Canada collected numerous fossilized eggs at Kamitaki, including the specimens which they would refer to a new oogenus and oospecies: Nipponoolithus rumosus.

Description
Nipponoolithus rumosus is known only from a handful of isolated eggshell fragments ranging from 0.36 to 0.53 mm in thickness, just barely larger than a chicken egg.

Like most non-avian dinosaur eggs, it has two layers: the outer continuous layer, and the inner mammillary layer. The continuous layer is two to four times thicker than the mammillary layer. Nipponoolithus'''s outer surface is ornamented with low, branched ridges, similar to ornamentation observed in Macroelongatoolithus, Montanoolithus, Paraelongatoolithus, Reticuloolithus, Spheruprismatoolithus, and the eggs of Deinonychus. The crystals in the mammillary layer are acicular or wedge-like.

PaleobiologyN. rumosus was most likely laid by some kind of non-avian maniraptor because of its similarities in microstructure and ornamentation to oviraptorosaur eggs and the eggs of Deinonychus. These eggs, along with skeletal remains, show that the parents of Nipponoolithus coexisted with numerous other small theropods, as well as an assemblage of ankylosaurs, titanosaurs, hadrosauroids, tyrannosaurs, and therizinosaurs.

ParataxonomyNipponoolithus has not been place into any described oofamily. It contains a single oospecies: N. rumosus''.

References

Dinosaur reproduction
Egg fossils
Fossil parataxa described in 2016
Extinct animals of Japan
Prehistoric maniraptorans
Fossils of Japan